Iran participated at the 2008 Summer Paralympics in Beijing, China. The country's delegation consists of 72 competitors in nine sports: football 7-a-side, goalball, judo, powerlifting, shooting, table tennis, track and field athletics, volleyball, and wheelchair basketball.

Competitors

Medal summary

Medal table

Medalists

Results by event

Athletics

Men

Women

Football 7-a-side

Men

Goalball

Men

Judo

Men

Powerlifting

Men

Shooting

Men

Women

Mixed

Sitting volleyball

Men

Table tennis

Women

Wheelchair basketball

Men

References

External links
International Paralympic Committee

Nations at the 2008 Summer Paralympics
2008
Paralympics